The Battle of Manila, sometimes called the Mock Battle of Manila, was a land engagement which took place in Manila on August 13, 1898, at the end of the Spanish–American War, four months after the decisive victory by Commodore Dewey's Asiatic Squadron at the Battle of Manila Bay. The belligerents were Spanish forces led by Governor-General of the Philippines Fermín Jáudenes, and American forces led by United States Army Major General Wesley Merritt and United States Navy Commodore George Dewey. American forces were supported by units of the Philippine Revolutionary Army, led by Emilio Aguinaldo.

The battle is sometimes referred to as the "Mock Battle of Manila" because the local commanders of the Spanish and American forces, who were legally at war, secretly and jointly planned the battle to transfer control of the city center from the Spanish to the Americans while keeping the Philippine Revolutionary Army out of the city center. The battle left American forces in control of Intramuros, the center of Manila, surrounded by Philippine revolutionary forces, creating the conditions for the Battle of Manila of 1899 and the start of the Philippine–American War.

Background

After the American victory in Manila Bay on May 1, the United States Navy, under Admiral George Dewey, blockaded the city of Manila and waited for land forces to arrive. The United States organized the Eighth Army Corps, dubbed the Philippine Expeditionary Force, under the command of Major General Wesley Merritt. On May 16, the vanguard of the force left San Francisco under the command of Brigadier General Thomas M. Anderson. Merritt, on the same day, asked for information concerning the strength of the Spanish in the Philippines. The American consul in Hong Kong gave the information needed: 21,000 men including 4,000 Filipinos, all but 1,000 of them in Manila. Dewey, however, sent more accurate information: around 40,000 troops including around 16,000 Filipinos, about 15,000 were situated in Manila, and nine artillery guns in Manila.

By June, U.S. and Filipino forces had taken control of most of the islands, except for the walled city of Intramuros. The first contingent of American troops arrived in Cavite on June 30, the second under General Francis V. Greene on July 17, and the third under General Arthur MacArthur on July 30. By this time, some 12,000 U.S. troops had landed in the Philippines. By mid-June, some 40,000 Filipino revolutionaries under General Antonio Luna had dug fourteen miles of trenches around Manila. Filipino revolutionaries, seizing control of Manila's only pumping station, cut off the water supply to the city.

Emilio Aguinaldo had presented surrender terms to Spanish Governor-General of the Philippines Basilio Augustín, who refused them initially, believing more Spanish troops would be sent to lift the siege. As the combined forces of Filipinos and Americans closed in, Augustín, realizing that his position was hopeless, secretly continued to negotiate with Aguinaldo, even offering ₱1 million, but the latter refused.  When the Spanish parliament, the Cortes, learned of Governor-General Augustín's attempt to negotiate the surrender of the army to Filipinos under Aguinaldo, it was furious, and relieved Augustín of his duties as Governor-General, effective July 24, to be replaced by Fermin Jáudenes. On June 16, warships departed Spain to lift the siege, but they altered course for Cuba where a Spanish fleet was imperiled by the U.S. Navy.  In August, life in Intramuros (the walled center of Manila), where the normal population of about ten thousand had swelled to about seventy thousand, had become unbearable. Realizing that it was only a matter of time before the city fell, and fearing vengeance and looting if the city fell to Filipino revolutionaries, Governor Jáudenes suggested to Dewey, through the Belgian consul, Édouard André, that the city be surrendered to the Americans after a short, "mock" battle. Dewey had initially rejected the suggestion because he lacked the troops to block the Filipino revolutionary forces, but when Merritt's troops became available he sent a message to Jáudenes, agreeing to the mock battle.

Merritt was eager to seize the city, but Dewey stalled while trying to work out a bloodless solution with Jáudenes. On August 4, Dewey and Merritt gave Jáudenes 48 hours to surrender, later extending the deadline by five days when it expired. Covert negotiations continued, with the details of the mock battle being arranged on August 10. The plan agreed to was that Dewey would begin a bombardment at 09:00 on August 13, shelling only Fort San Antonio Abad, a decrepit structure on the southern outskirts of Manila, and the impregnable walls of Intramuros. Simultaneously, Spanish forces would withdraw, Filipino revolutionaries would be checked, and U.S. forces would advance. Once a sufficient show of battle had been made, Dewey would hoist the signal "D.W.H.B." (meaning "Do you surrender?), whereupon the Spanish would hoist a white flag and Manila would formally surrender to U.S. forces. Under this plan, Spanish forces would be defeated by American forces, while Filipino forces would not be allowed to enter the city. This minimized the risk of unnecessary casualties on all sides, while the Spanish would also avoid the shame of possibly having to surrender Intramuros to the Filipino forces.

Battle
On the evening of August 12, on orders of General Merritt, General Anderson notified Aguinaldo to forbid the insurgents under his command from entering Manila,   stating "Do not let your troops enter Manila without the permission of the American commander. On this side of the Pasig River you will be under fire".

On August 13, with American commanders unaware that a peace protocol had been signed between Spain and the U.S. the previous day, Dewey began his bombardment as scheduled. Dewey directed his ship captains to spare Manila any serious damage, but gunners on one ship, unaware of the negotiated arrangements, scored several direct hits before its captain was able to cease firing and withdraw from the line.

General Greene's brigade pushed rapidly through Malate and over the bridges to occupy Binondo and San Miguel The advancing Americans made good use of new weapons, such as the M1897 Trench Gun which was ideal for close combat. General Arthur MacArthur Jr., advancing simultaneously on the Pasay road, encountered and overcame resistance at the blockhouses, trenches, and woods to his front, advanced and held the bridges and the town of Malate. This placed Manila in American possession, except for Intramuros. Shortly after entering Malate, U.S. troops observed a white flag displayed on the walls of Intramuros. Lieutenant Colonel C. A. Whittier, United States Volunteers, representing General Merritt, and Lieutenant Brumby, U.S. Navy, representing Admiral Dewey, were sent ashore to communicate with the Captain-General. General Merritt soon personally followed, met with Governor General Jáudenes, and concluded a preliminary agreement of the terms of capitulation.

Insurgents made an independent attack of their own, as planned, which promptly led to trouble with the Americans. At 08:00 that morning, Aguinaldo received a telegram from General Anderson, sternly warning him not to let his troops enter Manila without the consent of the American commander, who was situated on the south side of the Pasig River. General Anderson's request was ignored, and Aguinaldo's forces crowded forward alongside the American forces until they directly confronted the Spanish troops. Although the Spanish were waving a flag of truce, the insurgents fired on the Spanish forces, provoking return fire. 

Though a bloodless mock battle had been planned, Spanish troops had opened fire in a skirmish which left six Americans and forty-nine Spaniards dead when Filipino revolutionaries, thinking that the attack was genuine, joined advancing U.S. troops. Except for the unplanned casualties, the battle had gone according to plan; the Spanish had surrendered the city to the Americans, and it had not fallen to the Filipino revolutionaries. 19 American soldiers were killed, and 103 more were wounded in this action.

Aftermath

General Anderson sent Aguinaldo a telegram, later that day, which read:

Aguinaldo however demanded joint occupation of Manila. On August 13 Admiral Dewey and General Merritt informed their superiors of this and asked how far they might proceed in enforcing obedience in the matter.

General Merritt received news of the August 12 peace protocol on August 16, three days after the surrender of Manila. Admiral Dewey and General Merritt were informed by a telegram dated August 17 that the President of the United States had directed: 

Insurgent forces were looting the portions of the city which they occupied, and were not confining their attacks to Spaniards, but were assaulting their own people and raiding the property of foreigners as well. U.S. commanders pressed Aguinaldo to withdraw his forces from Manila. Negotiations proceeded slowly and, on September 8, General Elwell Otis (General Merritt being unavailable) wrote, in a long letter to Aguinaldo: 

After further negotiation and exchanges of letters, Aguinaldo wrote on September 16: "On the evening of the 15th the armed insurgent organizations withdrew from the city and all of its suburbs, ...

For all practical purposes, the fall of Manila brought about the end of the Spanish–American War in the Philippines. Merritt and Dewey finally received word of the peace protocol on August 16. Captain Henry Glass of the protected cruiser  had accepted the surrender of Guam on June 20, while en route to Manila, and Captain E.D. Taussig of the gunboat  claimed Wake Island for the U.S. on January 17, 1899.

This battle marked the end of Filipino-American collaboration, as the American action of preventing Filipino forces from entering the captured city of Manila was deeply resented by the Filipinos. The war with Spain came to an end, but in February 1899, the Philippine–American War broke out. Tensions between the Filipino forces under Aguinaldo and the American Expeditionary forces were high. The Filipinos felt betrayed by the Americans. They had looked on the Americans as liberators aiding against Spanish occupation. On February 4, a U.S. Army private fired the first shot at a Filipino revolutionary soldier and Filipino revolutionary forces returned fire. This began the Battle of Manila of 1899. Aguinaldo sent a ranking member of his staff to Elwell Stephen Otis, the U.S. military commander, with the message that the firing had been against his orders. Otis replied, "The fighting, having begun, must go on to the grim end."

See also
 Battles of the Spanish–American War

References

Bibliography

Further reading

External links

 Home of heroes
 Spanish–American War

Manila 1898
1898 in the Philippines
Manila (1898), Battle of
Manila (1898)
Manila (1898), Battle of
Manila
August 1898 events
Manila
Manila (1898)
Manila